This is a list of films produced in Taiwan ordered by year of release. For an alphabetical list of Taiwanese films see :Category:Taiwanese films

2000

2001

2002

2003

2004

2005

2006

2007

2008

2009

References

External links
 Taiwanese film at the Internet Movie Database

2000s
2000s in Taiwan
Lists of 2000s films